Trade Wars is a series of video games dating back to 1984. The video games are inspired by Hunt the Wumpus, the board game Risk, and the original space trader game Star Trader.

History
The first game with the title, "Trade Wars", by Chris Sherrick, was developed in BASIC for the TRS-80_Model_II, and soon ported, by Sherrick, to the IBM PC for the Nochange BBS system in 1984. Sherrick conceived his game as a cross between Dave Kaufman's BASIC program Star Trader 1974, the board game Risk, and Gregory Yob's Hunt the Wumpus 1972.

Because Sherrick released his earliest versions with a free license, many variations of the game appeared over the next few years, including TWV - Galactic Armageddon, Yankee Trader, and TW2 (a development of the original by John Morris who took over from Chris Sherrick).

One of the more popular variants is the TradeWars 2002 series (Gary Martin, John Pritchett, 1986).  TW2002 was designed originally as a WWIV chain (a way of calling external programs which was a part of Turbo Pascal 3 - and one that often required the source code to work, which is why so many people were able to get copies) in September 1986 by a sysop with the handle "Lord Darkseid" (his BBS was called Apokolips, and he was apparently a DC Comics fan). Its original name was TW2 for WWIV - and it shared no source code with the Sherrick version, which was written in Basic. Another WWIV sysop - B0b "OM" Mosley - made additional modifications, including porting the code to Turbo Pascal 4.x specifications, numerous bug fixes, a series of cosmetic changes to allow the game to reflect a Star Trek theme, and development of a map editor that allowed for both larger maps and the ability to randomly generate new maps as well as reinitialize the game's databases to reflect the new map data. High school student Dylan Tynan ("Sorcerer" and "Alex and Droogs"), worked with Mosley during the rewrite, serving as the primary tester, as well as contributing source fixes and additional features. After two years of development, Mosley released the source code for the game and editor, which allowed fellow WWIV sysop Gary Martin to make his own changes to the included source code. Gary's first version was Trade Wars 2001, and it contained many of the base features. It also used exactly the same TWSECT.DAT file (the file which contains the information on all of the warp points in the game) as Trade Wars 2002.

While TW2001 was well received, Gary decided to expand the game further. In addition to the port in Sector 1 where you could buy fighters/shields/holds, another port was added called the Stardock where you could buy new types of ships. Over a period of time, feature after feature was added, so that Trade Wars 2002 v0.96 was a very different game than Trade Wars 2002 v1.00. TW2002 v1.00 was released in June 1991. One of the major design choices made was influenced by changes in the BBS software — WWIV author Wayne Bell had rewritten the WWIV BBS System using Turbo C instead of Turbo Pascal. This meant that classic Chain programs would no longer work, and Trade Wars 2002 v2 used a general purpose door library which allowed the game to be run under other brands of BBS software for the first time.

TW2002 v1, v2, & v3 were BBS mainstays throughout the 1990s. In 1998, Gary Martin sold the Trade Wars license to John Pritchett, who had written Tradewars 2002 v3 and its gold expansion. John and his company, EIS, developed a stand-alone game server, TradeWars Game Server, which has allowed Trade Wars to survive beyond the BBS era.

Gameplay
Though specifics vary between versions, in general the player is a trader in a galaxy with a fixed set of other players (either human or computer). The players seek to gain control of resources: usually fuel ore, food, and equipment, and travel through sectors of the galaxy trading them for money or undervalued resources. Players use their wealth to upgrade their spaceship with better weapons and defenses, and fight for control of planets and star bases.

Since the basics of the game structure are numerical, these games are not reliant on high resolution graphics or rapid processing, which makes them ideally suited to low-resource computing platforms.

Today, classic Trade Wars is primarily hosted by Windows NT/2000/XP computers running the Trade Wars Game Server (TWGS), which accepts incoming telnet connections and launches the Trade Wars ANSI game.  Trade Wars is also run by many of the surviving BBSs, and variations have been ported to the web, cell phones, and the Palm OS.

Reception
Computer Gaming World in 1993 rated Trade Wars two points out of three, stating that for many players "there is no 
other on-liner than Trade Wars ... This game will be around for a while, in one form or another".

Legacy
Trade Wars is cited as an influence by some game developers. Examples include Paul Sage, lead designer of Ultima Online, Josh Johnston, lead programmer of Jumpgate, and Eric Wang, producer of Earth and Beyond. In 2013, the designers of Star Citizen listed Trade Wars 2002 among the games that inspired the design of their in-game economy. Games that are often compared to TradeWars include EVE Online, Jumpgate, Rebel Galaxy, Elite Dangerous, Earth and Beyond, Pardus, and Spore.  Trade Wars 2002 was named the 10th best PC game of all time by PC World Magazine in 2009.

A major online game based on Trade Wars 2002 was under development in the early 2000s under the name TW: Dark Millennium, later renamed Exarch.  When the developer, Realm Interactive, was acquired by their publisher, NCsoft Austin (Richard Garriott/Destination Games), the development of Exarch was discontinued.  What started as TW: DM was eventually released by NCsoft as Dungeon Runners.

Canonical Name
Although it is common to see the game's name referenced as TradeWars or Trade Wars, the correct moniker for the game, as defined by Chris Sherrick in the original Trade Wars versions, is "Trade Wars".

See also

Space combat simulator

References

External links
Official TradeWars Museum
TradeWars tribute website
EIS, owner and developer of classic TradeWars
Official EIS TradeWars forum
History of Trade Wars 2002 - John Pritchett
A list of other ancient versions; alas none of the actual files have been archived here

Door games
1984 video games
TRS-80 games
Massively multiplayer online turn-based strategy games
Space trading and combat simulators
Space massively multiplayer online role-playing games
Browser-based multiplayer online games
Video games developed in the United States